Piyam (also Romanized as Piyām, Payām, and Pīām; also known as Yām) is a village in Mishab-e Shomali Rural District, in the Central District of Marand County, East Azerbaijan Province, Iran. At the 2006 census, its population was 1,389, in 336 families.

References 

Populated places in Marand County